Tapas Bapi Das (born 22 September 1954) is an Indian singer-songwriter, guitarist and music connoisseur. He was one of the founder members of the Bengali rock band Moheener Ghoraguli established in 1975 in Kolkata. Being one of his kind, he can rightfully be called 'Moheener Adi Ghora' ('Moheen's earliest horse').

Early life and career

Born on 22 September in 1958 in typical Bengali family fourth son of Mr Narayan Chandra Das and Mrs Jyotsna Das. Bapi's musical journey started from an early age. His taste in the melody is wide and diverse. He also considers his mother, Jyotsna Das as his first Guru or teacher. A self-taught guitarist Bapi learnt to dabble with the string instrument during his college life. In 1975 Bapi became a part of the first Bengali rock band Moheener Ghoraguli, along with Gautam Chattopadhyay, Pradip Chatterjee, Ranjon Ghoshal, Bishwanath Chattopadhyay, Abraham Mazumdar, and Tapesh Bandopadhyay.

In 2015, Bapi being the mastermind and mentor behind the generation next has formed a Bengali band called Moheen Ekhon O Bondhura On 6 October, he released an EP album titled Mohin Ekhon O Bondhura with Lagnajita Chakraborty, Malabika Brahma and Titas Bhramar Sen. The album consists of five songs and a tribute album to Moheener Ghoraguli.

Discography

Moheener Ghoraguli albums

Shangbigno Pakhikul O Kolkata Bishayak (1977)
Ajaana UDonto bostu ba Aw-Oo-Baw (1978)
Drishyomaan Moheener Ghoraguli (1979)

Other
 Mohin Ekhon O Bondhura

References

External links

1958 births 
Bengali musicians
Moheener Ghoraguli members
Indian male musicians
Living people
Musicians from West Bengal